This is a list of the travellers who left accounts on Mughal Empire.

 Antonio Monserrate  (1536-1600, from Spain) 
 François Bernier (1625-1688, from France)
Jean-Baptiste Tavernier (1605-1689, from France)
Peter Mundy (1600-1667, from England)
 Seydi Ali Reis (1498 – 1563, from Turkey)
 Niccolao Manucci (1638-1717, from Venice)

References

India history-related lists
Mughal Empire
History of India
Explorers of Asia
Explorers of India
Expatriates in India